The Museum of Domestic Design and Architecture (MoDA) is a museum in North London, England, housing one of the most comprehensive collections of 19th- and 20th-century decorative arts for the home. The collection is designated as being of outstanding international value by Arts Council England.

The collections include the Silver Studio collection of designs for wallpapers and textiles, the Charles Hasler collection, and the Crown Wallpaper Archive.

The museum is part of Middlesex University. The MoDA Collections Centre is based at Beaufort Park in Colindale, close to Middlesex University's Hendon campus in the London Borough of Barnet.

The Silver Studio Collection 
The Silver Studio (run by the Silver family) was a commercial design practice, based in West London, which between 1880 and 1963 completed more than 20,000 schemes for items such as furnishing fabrics, wallpapers, tablecloths, rugs and carpets. The Studio employed a number of designers, some of whom were well known in their own right, and others whose work remained anonymous.

The Silver Studio's customers were retailers and manufacturers of wallpapers and textiles at all levels of the market, both in Britain and abroad. Designs for wallpapers were sold both to manufacturers producing cheap papers for the mass market, such as Lightbown Aspinall and Potters of Darwen, as well as those selling high quality products for the top end of the market, such as Essex & Co, John Line, and Sandersons. Silver Studio designs were bought by all the leading British textile manufacturers, including Stead McAlpin, Alexander Morton, and AH Lee, to name just a few. Clients included well known producers of high quality fabrics, such as Turnbull & Stockdale and the famous department store, Liberty.

Because the majority of the Silver Studio's clients were mass producers, Silver Studio designs found their way into numerous British homes. The Studio's influence on British interiors over a remarkable length of time can be seen in the huge number of their designs that went into production.

After it closed in the early 1960s, the contents of the Silver Studio were given to the Hornsey College of Art, which subsequently became part of what is now Middlesex University.

The significance of the Collection lies both in its completeness and coherence as a whole and in the importance and uniqueness of its component parts. It spans the period 1880–1960, an important period in the development of mass market furnishings and one less well represented in other collections.

Silver Studio designs found their way into many British homes over a long period, because most of its clients were mass producers. The significance of the Silver Studio as a design practice was acknowledged in 1981 with the awarding of an English Heritage blue plaque to 84 Brook Green, Hammersmith, the building that was both the Studio and the Silver family home.

Charles Hasler Collection 
This material was the working collection of designer and typographer, Charles Hasler (1908-1992). Hasler played a significant role in many high-profile exhibitions, displays, poster campaigns and book publishing in Britain from the mid-1930s to the mid-1980s.

Between 1942 and 1951, Hasler was an exhibition designer for the Ministry of Information and the Central Office of Information.  He worked on displays such as ‘Dig For Victory’, ‘Make Do and Mend’ and ‘Nation and the Child’. After the war, he became a senior designer and chairman of the Typographic Panel for the Festival of Britain of 1951.

Hasler designed and produced the influential Specimen of Display Letters for use by Festival architects and designers.  Throughout his career, Hasler lectured in typographic design and history and was involved with the education and professional development of print and graphic designers

Hasler was interested in the newly emerging field of packaging and branding and in the role of typographical design.  His collection reflects his keen interest in all kinds of printed material and includes postcards, playbills, sheet music, packaging and posters dating from the nineteenth century onwards.

Sir James Richards Library 
MoDA holds the Sir James Maude Richards Library on long-term loan.  This is a collection of architectural books and journals collected by Sir JM Richards (1907-1992), a leading spokesman and theorist of the Modern Movement in architecture in Britain.

Richards was the editor of The Architectural Review between 1937 and 1971, serving as critical spokesman on behalf of both architect and public alike.

The Architectural Review was launched in 1896. During the 1930s it was central to the debate concerning the Modern movement in Britain. It was international in its scope and became a forum for the best examples of Modern movement architecture. As editor of the magazine Richards met all of the leading architectural practitioners and theoreticians of the day, and this is reflected in the contents of his library.

His best-known book, Castles on the Ground (1946), represents his argument in favour of suburbia, and his appreciation of the 'everyday' built environment.

Sir JM Richards' Library consists of over 1500 volumes and contains all his own published work, plus books by leading artists and architectural writers including John Betjeman, John Piper, Osbert Lancaster, Nikolaus Pevsner, John Nash, Herbert Read and John Summerson.

Crown Wallpaper Archive 
MoDA's Crown Wallpaper Collection consists of around 5,000 wallpaper albums and samples dating from the early 1950s to the late 1960s, donated to the museum by Crown Wallpapers in 1989.

Along with the wallpapers of MoDA's Silver Studio Collection, this collection represents one of the country's finest bodies of non-elite wallpapers of the late nineteenth to the mid twentieth centuries.  The majority of the wallpapers held here were intended for the mass market, not for ‘high-end’ consumers, and can therefore be seen as a barometer of British taste over a long period.

The Crown Wallpaper complements our other collections, locating the product in its domestic setting and placing it in the context of histories of consumption, in particular in relation to suburbia.

MoDA also has a good selection of hand-printed wallpapers from the 1930s, by artists such as Edward Bawden, John Aldridge and Lawrence Scarfe.

The Domestic Design Collection 1870–1960 
This collection consists of over 4,000 books, journals, magazines and trade and retail catalogues relating to all aspects of home furnishing, household management, cookery, house building, DIY, home crafts and gardening.  This is a fantastic resource for anyone interested in domestic furnishings, homecraft or other aspects of domestic life; it is also useful as visual reference for those interested in typography, graphic design, book design and so on.

A particularly important element is the material relating to the growth of North London suburbia between around 1900 and 1939.  It consists of posters, brochures and other publicity material produced by property developers, builders and estate agents.  This material complements the other items relating to domestic decoration and furnishing from the same period.

Around 2,000 books and catalogues were originally part of the Silver Studio Collection, accumulated and used by the designers as sources of visual reference.  A further 1,000 or so items were collected by the former Art and Design Librarian of Hornsey College of Art during the 1980s.  The remainder have been acquired by purchase or donation over many years.

References

External links

Museum of Domestic Design and Architecture
Architecture museums in the United Kingdom
Domestic
Art museums established in 2000
Decorative arts museums in England
Design museums
Museum Of Domestic Design And Architecture
Museums in the London Borough of Barnet
Textile museums in the United Kingdom
University museums in England